Setalis is a genus of beetles in the family Carabidae, containing the following species:

 Setalis niger Castelnau, 1867
 Setalis rubripes Sloane, 1907
 Setalis sloanei Darlington, 1953

References

Pterostichinae